

Legislative Assembly elections

Delhi

Gujarat

Source:

Himachal Pradesh

Madhya Pradesh

Source:

Meghalaya

 The UDP was formed in 1997 through a merger of the Hill People's Union (HPU), some members of the Hill State People's Democratic Party (HDP) and the Public Demands Implementation Convention (PDIC). Previous results presented in the table are the combined totals of parties' results from the 1993 election.

Mizoram

Nagaland

Rajasthan

Tripura

Source:

Rajya Sabha

References

External links

 Election Commission of India

1998 elections in India
India
1998 in India
Elections in India by year